The Man on the Box is a 1925 American comedy film directed by Charles Reisner and written by Charles Logue. It is based on the 1904 novel The Man on the Box by Harold MacGrath. The film stars Sydney Chaplin, David Butler, Alice Calhoun, Cathleen Calhoun, Theodore Lorch, and Helene Costello. The film was released by Warner Bros. on October 11, 1925.

Plot
Bob Warburton, a wealthy young bachelor, falls in love with Betty Annesly and, in order to be close to her, is hired as a gardener by her father, Colonel Annesley. However, the girl discovers the trick of her admirer and, to teach him a lesson, insists that the new gardener serve at the table during an important lunch. Bob refuses the task and so is replaced by Count Karloff's butler who offers, for the occasion, to lend it to the landlord. Bob realizes that Badkoff, the butler, is an enemy agent tasked with stealing secret helicopter plans from Betty's father. Disguised as a waitress, Bob puts a spoke in the wheel of the spy, saving the precious documents. Eventually, he also wins over beautiful Betty, taking her to the altar.

Cast

Box office
According to Warner Bros records the film earned $425,000 domestically and $63,000 foreign.

References

External links

1925 films
1920s English-language films
Silent American comedy films
1925 comedy films
Warner Bros. films
Films directed by Charles Reisner
American silent feature films
American black-and-white films
Films based on American novels
Remakes of American films
1920s American films